Parasyrphus annulatus is a Palearctic species of hoverfly.

Description

External images
For terms see Morphology of Diptera
Wing length 5-5.8 mm. Tibiae and tarsi 1 and 2 yellow. Thorax dorsum dull green. Femorae 3 black with yellow base and apex. Female frons with large dust marks. The male genitalia are figured by Hippa (1968)).  
See references for determination.

Distribution
Palearctic Fennoscandia South to Alpes Maritimes. Ireland East through Northern Europe and Central Europe. North Italy and Yugoslavia, then European Russia and Caucasus on to Siberia and the Russian Far East to the Pacific coast (Kuril Isles).

Biology
Habitat: Larix, other coniferous forest, Quercus forest. Flowers visited include white umbellifers, Allium, Caltha, Cardamine, Euphorbia, Galium, Inula, Ligustrum, Meum, Prunus spinosa, Pyrus communis, Ranunculus, Rubus idaeus, Sambucus nigra, Sorbus aucuparia, Viburnum opulus.

The flight period is May/ to August.The larva is aphid feeding.

References

Diptera of Europe
Syrphinae
Syrphini
Insects described in 1838
Taxa named by Johan Wilhelm Zetterstedt
Palearctic insects